Michele Polverino (born 26 September 1984) is a retired naturalized Liechtenstein football midfielder, who last played for FC Balzers.

Club career

FC Schaan 
Polverino played for the youth teams of FC Schaan until he was 18, when he moved to FC Vaduz

FC Vaduz 
He joined FC Vaduz in the summer of 2002, making 11 league appearances in his first season in the Swiss Challenge League (then known as the Nationalliga B). He remained with Vaduz until the end of the 2004–05 season, making 60 league appearances and scoring 8 goals.

Olbia Calcio 
For the 2005–06 season, Polverino played for Olbia Calcio of Serie C2, making 26 league appearances and scoring 1 goal as the club narrowly avoided relegation by winning the relegation playoff.

Second spell with FC Vaduz 
Polverino rejoined Vaduz at the end of the 2005–06 season. He was part of the FC Vaduz squad that won promotion to the Swiss Super League for the first time in the club's history in the 2007–08 season. He left at the end of the 2008–09 season, after the club was relegated back to the Swiss Challenge League.

FC Aarau 
At the start of the 2009–10 season, Polverino joined FC Aarau of the Swiss Super League. At the end of the season the club was relegated down to the second tier, with Polverino leaving at the end of the 2010–11 season. He played 51 league matches for Aarau

Steel Azin 
Polverino spent one season at Steel Azin of the Iranian Azadegan League (2nd tier of Iranian football). He was part of the squad that initially finished 3rd in the league, but the team was docked 12 points by FIFA and relegated to the 3rd tier.

Wolfberger AC 
Polverino joined Wolfsberger AC of the Austrian Bundesliga in 2012, making 53 league appearances and 6 appearances in the ÖFB-Cup in his 2 seasons with the club.

Third spell with FC Vaduz 
For the 2014–15 season, Polverino returned again to FC Vaduz, however he made just 4 league appearances for the club and left at the end of the season

FC Rapperswil-Jona 
Polverino joined Rapperswil-Jona for two months in 2016, making 3 league appearances

FC Balzers 
Polverino joined FC Balzers, a Liechtenstein club playing in the Swiss 1st League (4th tier), in 2016.

International career 
He made his international debut on 2 June 2007, in a 1–1 draw with Iceland in EURO 2008 qualifying.

On 17 November 2019, Polverino announced he was to retire from international football after the EURO 2020 qualifying match against Bosnia and Herzegovina. The game was his 79th and final cap for his country.

Honours
 U-15 Swiss Cup-winner
 Promotion with FC Vaduz to the Axpo Super League

International goals
Scores and results list Liechtenstein's goal tally first.

References

External links
 
 
 Michele Polverino Interview

1984 births
Living people
Liechtenstein footballers
Liechtenstein international footballers
Swiss men's footballers
Liechtenstein people of Italian descent
Swiss people of Italian descent
FC Vaduz players
FC Aarau players
Swiss Super League players
Wolfsberger AC players
Steel Azin F.C. players
Association football midfielders
SV Ried players
FC Rapperswil-Jona players
FC Balzers players